Dmitry Vladimirovich Nevmerzhitsky (born 27 February 1975) is an archer from Russia.

Nevmerzhitskiy competed at the 2004 Summer Olympics in men's individual archery.  He was defeated in the first round of elimination, placing 53rd overall.

External links 
Biography 

Russian male archers
Olympic archers of Russia
Archers at the 2004 Summer Olympics
1975 births
Living people